Constance Senghor (born May 23, 1963) is a retired female high jumper from Senegal. She competed for her native country at the 1984 Summer Olympics in Los Angeles, California, finishing in 27th place in the final rankings with a jump of 1.70 m.

Achievements

External links
 sports-reference

1963 births
Living people
Senegalese female high jumpers
Athletes (track and field) at the 1984 Summer Olympics
Olympic athletes of Senegal
African Games bronze medalists for Senegal
African Games medalists in athletics (track and field)
Athletes (track and field) at the 1987 All-Africa Games